Earll Douwrie (born ) is a South African rugby union player for the  in the Currie Cup. His regular position is fullback.

He previously represented Enisei-STM in the European Rugby Challenge Cup, making 6 appearances over the course of the 2019–20 European Rugby Challenge Cup. He joined the  ahead of the newly formed Super Rugby Unlocked competition.

References

South African rugby union players
Living people
1997 births
Rugby union fullbacks
Yenisey-STM Krasnoyarsk players
Griquas (rugby union) players
Blue Bulls players